W. Percy Malone (born August 23, 1942) is an American politician, pharmacist, and businessman.

Born in Rosedale, Mississippi, Malone graduated from University of Mississippi School of Pharmacy in 1965. He is a pharmacist and president of W. P. Malone, Incorporated in Arkadelphia, Arkansas. He served in the Arkansas Constitutional Convention of 1980. From 1995 to 1999, Malone served in the Arkansas House of Representatives. Then, from 2001 to 2013 Malone served in the Arkansas State Senate. Malone was a Democrat.

In 2010, he became the namesake and first winner of the Child Advocacy Centers of Arkansas Percy Malone Child Protection Award.

Notes

1942 births
Living people
People from Arkadelphia, Arkansas
People from Rosedale, Mississippi
University of Mississippi alumni
Pharmacists from Arkansas
Businesspeople from Arkansas
Democratic Party members of the Arkansas House of Representatives
Democratic Party Arkansas state senators